Paul Aussem (died 1679) was a Roman Catholic prelate who served as Auxiliary Bishop of Köln (1676–1679) and  Titular Bishop of Halmiros (1676–1679).

Biography
Paul Aussem was born in Cologne, Germany in 1616.
On 19 Oct 1676, he was appointed during the papacy of Pope Innocent XI as Auxiliary Bishop of Köln and Titular Bishop of Halmiros.
On 10 Jan 1677, he was consecrated bishop by Opizio Pallavicini, Titular Archbishop of Ephesus. 
He served as Auxiliary Bishop of Köln until his death on 24 Nov 1679.

References

External links and additional sources
 (for Chronology of Bishops) 
 (for Chronology of Bishops) 
 (for Chronology of Bishops) 
 (for Chronology of Bishops)  

17th-century German Roman Catholic bishops
Bishops appointed by Pope Innocent XI
1616 births
1679 deaths